Romain-Vincent Jeuffroy (16 July 1749 – 2 August 1826) was a French gemstone engraver and medalist. He was active before and during the French Revolution and the First French Empire, and made many medals for Napoleon.

Life

Romain-Vincent Jeuffroy was born on 16 July 1749 in Rouen.
He learned his art without a master, imitating an engraved stone that had come into his hands. He made his own tools. 
He became known, and was sponsored to go to Rome to perfect his art.
In 1770 Jeuffroy went to Rome and then to Naples, where he lived for ten years. 
He worked with Johannes Pichler.
He produced many engraved or embossed works, including much work for the French ambassador, the Marquis Jean-Baptiste-Charles-François de Clermont-d'Amboise.

After returning to France he made Paris his home.
After Jacques Guay (1715–1787) stopped working, Charles-Claude Flahaut de la Billaderie (1730–1809) tried to revive gemstone engraving.
He promised to give the work to Jeuffroy, but did not keep his engagement.
Jeuffroy engraved several portraits, which made his reputation.
In 1790 he accepted an offer from King Stanislaus II of Poland and moved to Warsaw.

Jeuffroy returned to Paris and was appointed a member of the Institut de France in 1803.
He created a commemorative medal for Napoleon entitled "The Treaty of Amiens Broken by England, May 1803".
Jeuffroy was made a Knight of the Legion of Honour.
In 1805 Napoleon founded a school of gemstone engraving, headed by Jeuffroy.
The school was established in the deaf-mute institution.
In 1816 Jeuffroy was made a member of the Académie des Beaux-Arts in the engraving section.

Jeuffroy died on 2 August 1826 in Bas-Prunay near Saint-Germain-en-Laye at the age of 77.
Pierre-Amédée Dupaty, the medal engraver and sculptor, was one of his pupils.
Nicolas-Pierre Tiolier, who became the official engraver of coins, was another pupil.

Work

Jeuffroy made masterpieces in his genre, particularly the heads of women.
His portrait subjects include the King of Poland, Prince Lubomirski and Julie Clary, Queen Consort of Naples.

Gemstone engravings

 Head of Jupiter
Louis XVI
Marie Antoinette
Military piety
Love floating on his quiver
Head of Regulus.
Angel worshiping
Medusa
The genius of Bacchus
Victor drinking from a cup
Bacchante

Medals

The Dauphin
Fourcroy
Madame d'Epremesnil
Mirabeau
Dancarville
Mme. Regnault de Saint-Jean d'Angely
Mme. Cosway
 The conquest of Hanover
Peace of Amiens
Coronation of Napoleon
Bonaparte armed. 
Capitulation of Spandau and Magdeburg. 
Death of Louis XVII. 
Accession of Louis XVIII, March 20. 
Petrarch. 
Heads of the three consuls. 
Venus de Medici. 
The Temple prison. 
Medal of the Legislature.
Seal of the Legion of Honor.

References

Sources

External links
 

1749 births
1826 deaths
French engravers